

Mosses

Archosauromorphs

Newly named dinosaurs
Data courtesy of George Olshevsky's dinosaur genera list.

Newly named pseudosuchians

Synapsids

Non-mammalian

References

1940s in paleontology
Paleontology
Paleontology 7